Smart Metrology is the modern approach to industrial metrology. The name has been introduced by Jean-Michel Pou and Laurent Leblond, a French metrologists and a French statistician, in their book "La Smart Metrology: De la métrologie des instruments... à la métrologie des décisions". and has been immediately adopted by Deltamu, a French company providing services in the field of industrial metrology, to promote its innovative vision of metrology.

The modern approach promoted by the Smart Metrology consists, mainly, in the full exploitation of all available data and information, including that provided by the Big Data, to implement a correct, pertinent and efficient approach to the three pillars of metrology (uncertainty, calibration and traceability) in the industrial applications

The Smart Metrology approach 
The approach suggested by Smart Metrology is fully framed inside the ISO 9001 recommendations that any industry using a measuring instrument must keep them under control.

The traditional approach 
The traditional approach to industrial metrology tends to follow these steps:

 The measurement system is almost always calibrated with a fixed and pre-determined periodicity by sending the instrument for calibration to an accreditation laboratory.
 The calibration results, provided by the calibration certificate, are very seldom used to correct the values measured by the calibrated instrument and evaluate uncertainty. Most often, the calibration certificate is kept in a folder.
 The unique way the calibration certificate is employed is generally during audits, to offer a formal proof that the measurement system is monitored and kept under control.

So, the actual results of the calibration may not even be used in the decision-making process. This way, metrology is often regarded as a pure cost and is actually not following the ISO 9001 quality standards.

Smart metrology innovation 
Smart metrology follows a different approach to keeping the instruments under control. This new approach is aimed at achieving a higher efficiency according to the following steps:

 The metrology system is designed according to the real industrial needs, following the "only-what-is-necessary" principle. A proper target uncertainty is defined, taking into account the acceptable risk of false acceptance/false rejection for the produced parts.
The measurement system is implemented to achieve the desired performance.
The measuring equipment is monitored using historical data and any other relevant data, including those possibly coming from the big data, to detect whether a doubt exists about the actual performance of the measuring equipment. If such a doubt exists, the equipment is calibrated.
The available (a-priori) information is used by applying advanced statistical approaches, such as Bayesian inference, to continually monitor the performance of the measuring equipment.
 The calibration intervals are conditioned to the real needs, as determined by the monitoring results, instead of pre-defining them at fixed intervals.
 The calibration certificate is used to correct the instrument readings and refine uncertainty evaluation.
 The obtained measurement data and the available a-priori knowledge are used in the decision-making process.
The results are discussed with the auditor to prove that pre-defined calibration intervals are not the most efficient solution to ensure quality.

According to the above steps, metrology does no longer represent an useless cost, afforded mainly to satisfy the standards. Instead, it can be regarded as an investment to enhance the quality of industrial production. It makes full use of the measurement results and makes use of measurement uncertainty in the decision-making process.

References 

Metrology